Thomasson is a surname. Notable people with the surname include:

Ben Thomasson, character in Men in Trees, American romantic television dramedy series on ABC
Benny Thomasson (1909–1984), American fiddler in the Texas style of old-time fiddling
Franklin Thomasson (1873–1941), English 19th century MP
Gary Thomasson (born 1951), former outfielder in Major League Baseball
Hughie Thomasson (1952–2007), American guitarist and singer, founding member of Outlaws
Jerry Thomasson (1931–2007), Democratic member of the Arkansas House of Representatives
Joe Thomasson (born 1993), American basketball player in the Israel Basketball Premier League
John Pennington Thomasson (1841–1904), English cotton spinner and Liberal Party politician
Sarah Thomasson (1925–1996), Swedish alpine skier
Thomas Thomasson (1808–1876), political economist and a campaigner for the repeal of the Corn Laws
William Thomasson (1797–1882), U.S. Representative from Kentucky

See also
Thomasson (disambiguation)
Thomason (surname)

Surnames from given names